Gaotou Hui Ethnic Township (Xiao'erjing: قَوْتِوْ خُوِذُو سِیْا) is a township of Wuji County in southwestern Hebei province, China, located  southwest of the county seat. , it has 15 villages under its administration.

See also
List of township-level divisions of Hebei

References

Township-level divisions of Hebei
Ethnic townships of the People's Republic of China
Wuji County